Paul Wesley Bruton (August 1, 1903 – July 16, 1988) was the Ferdinand Wakeman Hubbell Professor of Law and the Algernon Sydney Biddle Professor of Law at the University of Pennsylvania Law School.

Biography

Bruton received his A.B. and his LL.B. in 1929 from the University of California, and his J.S.D. in 1930 from Yale University.

Bruton was the Ferdinand Wakeman Hubbell Professor of Law and the Algernon Sydney Biddle Professor of Law at the University of Pennsylvania Law School, at which he started teaching in 1937. He taught at the law school for 37 years.  He was Acting Dean of the law school during 1951 to 1952.

Among his writings were Constitutional Law: Cases and Materials, with Edward Louis Barrett and John Honnold (Foundation Press, 1968) and Bruton's Cases and materials on Federal taxation, 
with Raymond J. Bradley (West Pub. Co., 1953).

References 

University of Pennsylvania Law School faculty
University of California alumni
Yale Law School alumni
1903 births
1988 deaths
Deans of law schools in the United States
American scholars of constitutional law